Cuba's foreign policy has been fluid throughout history depending on world events and other variables, including relations with the United States. Without massive Soviet subsidies and its primary trading partner, Cuba became increasingly isolated in the late 1980s and early 1990s after the fall of the USSR and the end of the Cold War, but Cuba opened up more with the rest of the world again starting in the late 1990s when they have since entered bilateral co-operation with several South American countries, most notably Venezuela and Bolivia beginning in the late 1990s, especially after the Venezuela election of Hugo Chávez in 1999, who became a staunch ally of Castro's Cuba. The United States used to stick to a policy of isolating Cuba until December 2014, when Barack Obama announced a new policy of diplomatic and economic engagement. The European Union accuses Cuba of "continuing flagrant violation of human rights and fundamental freedoms". Cuba has developed a growing relationship with the People's Republic of China and Russia. In all, Cuba continues to have formal relations with 160 nations, and provided civilian assistance workers – principally medical – in more than 20 nations. More than one million exiles have escaped to foreign countries. Cuba's present foreign minister is Bruno Rodríguez Parrilla.

Cuba is currently a lead country on the United Nations Human Rights Council, and is a founding member of the organization known as the Bolivarian Alternative for the Americas, a member of the Community of Latin American and Caribbean States, the Latin American Integration Association and the United Nations. Cuba is a member of the Non-Aligned Movement and hosted its September 2006 summit. In addition as a member of the Association of Caribbean States (ACS), Cuba was re-appointed as the chair- of the special committee on transportation issues for the Caribbean region. Following a meeting in November 2004, several leaders of South America have attempted to make Cuba either a full or associate member of the South American trade bloc known as Mercosur.

History

Spanish colonial period 

Prior to achieving its independence, Cuba was a colony of Spain.

1898–1959 
Prior to the triumph of the Cuban Revolution, Cuba maintained strong economic and political ties to the United States. From 1902 until its abrogation in 1934, the Platt Amendment authorized the US to use military force to preserve Cuba's independence.

In 1917, Cuba entered World War I on the side of the allies.

Cuba joined the League of Nations in 1920.

In 1941, Cuba declared war on Italy, Germany, and Japan.

Cuba joined the United Nations in 1945.

Cuba joined the Organization of American States (OAS) in 1948.

During the Presidency of Fulgencio Batista, Cuba did not initially face trade restrictions. In mid-1958, the United States imposed an arms embargo on the Batista administration.

The Cold War 

Following the establishment of diplomatic ties to the Soviet Union, and after the Cuban Missile Crisis, Cuba became increasingly dependent on Soviet markets and military and economic aid. Castro was able to build a formidable military force with the help of Soviet equipment and military advisors. The KGB kept in close touch with Havana, and Castro tightened Communist Party control over all levels of government, the media, and the educational system, while developing a Soviet-style internal police force.

Castro's alliance with the Soviet Union caused something of a split between him and Guevara. In 1966, Guevara left for Bolivia in an ill-fated attempt to stir up revolution against the country's government.

On August 23, 1968, Castro made a public gesture to the USSR that caused the Soviet leadership to reaffirm their support for him. Two days after Warsaw Pact invasion of Czechoslovakia to repress the Prague Spring, Castro took to the airwaves and publicly denounced the Czech rebellion. Castro warned the Cuban people about the Czechoslovakian 'counterrevolutionaries', who "were moving Czechoslovakia towards capitalism and into the arms of imperialists". He called the leaders of the rebellion "the agents of West Germany and fascist reactionary rabble." In return for his public backing of the invasion, at a time when some Soviet allies were deeming the invasion an infringement of Czechoslovakia's sovereignty, the Soviets bailed out the Cuban economy with extra loans and an immediate increase in oil exports.

The relationship between the Soviet Union's KGB and the Cuban Intelligence Directorate was complex and marked by times of extremely close cooperation and times of extreme competition. The Soviet Union saw the new revolutionary government in Cuba as an excellent proxy agent in areas of the world where Soviet involvement was not popular on a local level. Nikolai Leninov, the KGB Chief in Mexico City, was one of the first Soviet officials to recognize Fidel Castro's potential as a revolutionary and urged the Soviet Union to strengthen ties with the new Cuban leader. Moscow saw Cuba as having far more appeal with new revolutionary movements, western intellectuals, and members of the New Left with Cuba's perceived David and Goliath struggle against US imperialism. Shortly after the Cuban Missile Crisis in 1963, Moscow invited 1,500 DI agents, including Che Guevara, to the KGB's Moscow Center for intensive training in intelligence operations.

After the revolution of 1959, Cuba soon took actions inimical to American trade interests on the island. In response, the U.S. stopped buying Cuban sugar and refused to supply its former trading partner with much needed oil. Relations between the countries deteriorated rapidly. In April 1961, following air attacks preparing for the Bay of Pigs Invasion by CIA-trained Cuban exiles, prime minister Fidel Castro declared Cuba to be a socialist republic, and moved quickly to develop the growing relations between Cuba and the Soviet Union.

In 1962, Cuba was expelled from the Organization of American States. Shortly afterwards, many nations throughout Latin America broke ties with Cuba, leaving the island increasingly isolated in the region and dependent on Soviet trade and cooperation.

Following the establishment of diplomatic ties, and after the Cuban Missile Crisis in 1962, Cuba became increasingly dependent on Soviet markets and military and economic aid. Cuba was able to build a large military force with the help of Soviet equipment and military advisers, but as the years passed, Cuba's economy began to decline as a result on mismanagement of the economy and low productivity, which was further aggravated by the U.S. embargo. Despite this, the Soviets also kept in close touch with Havana, sharing varying close relations until the collapse of the bloc in 1990.

Relations in Latin America during the Cold War 

During the Cold War, Cuba's influence in the Americas was inhibited by the Monroe Doctrine and the dominance of the United States.   Despite this Fidel Castro became an influential figurehead for leftist groups in the region, extending support to Marxist Revolutionary movements throughout Latin America, most notably aiding the Sandinistas in overthrowing Somoza in Nicaragua in 1979. In 1971, Fidel Castro took a month-long visit to Chile. The visit, in which Castro participated actively in the internal politics of the country, holding massive rallies and giving public advice to Salvador Allende, was seen by those on the political right as proof to support their view that "The Chilean Way to Socialism" was an effort to put Chile on the same path as Cuba.

Intervention in Cold War conflicts 

During the Cold War, Africa was a major target of Cuba's influence. Fidel Castro stated that Africa was chosen in part to represent Cuban solidarity with its own large population of African descent. Exporting Cuba's  revolutionary tactics abroad increased its worldwide influence and reputation. Wolf Grabendorff states that "Most African states view Cuban intervention in Africa as help in achieving independence through self-help rather than as a step toward the type of dependence which would result from a similar commitment by the super-powers." Cuban Soldiers were sent to fight in the Simba rebellion in the DRC during the 1960s. Furthermore, by providing military aid Cuba won trading partners for the Soviet bloc and potential converts to Marxism.

Starting in the 1970s, Cuba's intervened in 17 African nations including three insurgencies. Cuba expanded military programs to Africa and the Middle East, sending military missions to Sierra Leone in 1972, South Yemen in 1973, Equatorial Guinea in 1973, and Somalia in 1974. It sent combat troops to Syria in 1973 to fight against Israel. Cuba was following the general Soviet policy of détente with the West, and secret discussions were opened with the United States about peaceful coexistence. They ended abruptly when Cuba sent combat troops to fight in Angola in 1975.

Intervention in Africa

On November 4, 1975, Castro ordered the deployment of Cuban troops to Angola to aid the Marxist MPLA against UNITA, which were supported by the People's Republic of China, United States, Israel, and South Africa (see: Cuba in Angola). After two months on their own, Moscow aided the Cuban mission with the USSR engaging in a massive airlift of Cuban forces into Angola. Both Cuban and South African forces withdrew in the late 1980s and Namibia was granted  independence. The Angolan civil war would last until 2002. Nelson Mandela is said to have remarked "Cuban internationalists have done so much for African independence, freedom, and justice." Cuban troops were also sent to Marxist Ethiopia to assist Mengistu Haile Mariam's government in the Ogaden War with Somalia in 1977. Cuba sent troops along with the Soviet Union to aid the FRELIMO government against the Rhodesian and South African-backed RENAMO.
Castro never disclosed the number of casualties in Soviet African wars, but one estimate is that 14,000 Cubans were killed in Cuban military actions abroad.

Intervention in Latin America

In addition, Castro extended support to Marxist Revolutionary movements throughout Latin America, such as aiding the Sandinistas in overthrowing the Somoza government in Nicaragua in 1979.

Leadership of non-aligned movement

In the 1970s, Fidel Castro made a major effort to assume a leadership role in the non-aligned movement, which include over 90 countries. Cuba's intervention in Angola other military advisory missions, economic and social programs were praised fellow non-aligned member. The 1976 world conference of the non-aligned Movement applauded Cuban internationalism, stating that it "assisted the people of Angola in frustrating the expansionist and colonialist strategy of South Africa's racist regime and its allies." The next non-aligned conference was held in Havana in 1979, and chaired by Castro, who became the de facto spokesman for the Movement. The conference in September 1979 marked the peak of Cuban global influence. The non-aligned nations had believed that Cuba was not aligned with the Soviet Union in the Cold War.  However, in December 1979, the Soviet Union invaded Afghanistan, an active member of the non-aligned Movement. At the United Nations, non-aligned members voted 56 to 9, with 26 abstaining, to condemn the Soviet invasion. Cuba,   however, was deeply in debt financially and politically to Moscow, and voted against the resolution. It lost its reputation as non-aligned in the Cold War. Castro, instead of becoming a spokesman for the Movement, became inactive, and in 1983, leadership passed to India, which had abstained on the UN vote. Cuba lost its bid to become a member of the United Nations Security Council. Cuba's ambitions for a role in global leadership had ended.

Social and economic programs

Cuba had social and economic programs in 40 developing countries. This was possible by a growing Cuban economy in the 1970s. The largest programs were construction projects, in which 8,000 Cubans provided technical advice, planning, and training of engineers. Educational programs involved 3,500 teachers. In addition thousands of specialists, technicians, and engineers were sent as advisors to agricultural mining and transportation sectors around the globe. Cuba also hosted 10,000 foreign students, mostly from Africa and Latin America, in health programs and technical schools.  Cuba's extensive program of medical support to international attention. A 2007 study reported:
Since the early 1960s, 28,422 Cuban health workers have worked in 37 Latin American countries, 31,181 in 33 African countries, and 7,986 in 24 Asian countries. Throughout a period of four decades, Cuba sent 67,000 health workers to structural cooperation programs, usually for at least two years, in 94 countries ... an average of 3,350 health workers working abroad every year between 1960 and 2000.

Post–Cold War relations 

In the post–Cold War environment Cuban support for guerrilla warfare in Latin America has largely subsided, though the Cuban government continued to provide political assistance and support for left leaning groups and parties in the developing Western Hemisphere.

When Soviet leader Mikhail Gorbachev visited Cuba in 1989, the ideological relationship between Havana and Moscow was strained by Gorbachev's implementation of economic and political reforms in the USSR. "We are witnessing sad things in other socialist countries, very sad things", lamented Castro in November 1989, in reference to the changes that were sweeping such communist allies as the Soviet Union, East Germany, Hungary, and Poland. The subsequent dissolution of the Soviet Union in 1991 had an immediate and devastating effect on Cuba.

Cuba today works with a growing bloc of Latin American politicians opposed to the "Washington consensus", the American-led doctrine that free trade, open markets, and privatization will lift poor third world countries out of economic stagnation. The Cuban government condemned neoliberalism as a destructive force in the developing world, creating an alliance with Presidents Hugo Chávez of Venezuela and Evo Morales of Bolivia in opposing such policies.

Currently, Cuba has diplomatically friendly relationships with Presidents Nicolás Maduro of Venezuela and Daniel Ortega of Nicaragua, with Maduro as perhaps the country's staunchest ally in the post-Soviet era. Cuba has sent thousands of teachers and medical personnel to Venezuela to assist Maduro's socialist oriented economic programs. Maduro, in turn provides Cuba with lower priced petroleum. Cuba's debt for oil to Venezuela is believed to be on the order of one billion US dollars.

Bilateral relations

Africa

Americas 

Cuba has supported a number of leftist groups and parties in Latin America and the Caribbean since the 1959 revolution. In the 1960s Cuba established close ties with the emerging Guatemalan social movement led by Luis Augusto Turcios Lima, and supported the establishment of the URNG, a militant organization that has evolved into one of Guatemala's current political parties. In the 1980s Cuba backed both the Sandinistas in Nicaragua and the FMLN in El Salvador, providing military and intelligence training, weapons, guidance, and organizational support.

Asia

Europe

Oceania 

Cuba has two embassies in Oceania, located in Wellington (opened in November 2007) and also one in Canberra opened October 24, 2008. It also has a Consulate General in Sydney. However, Cuba has official diplomatic relations with Nauru since 2002 and the Solomon Islands since 2003, and maintains relations with other Pacific countries by providing aid.

In 2008, Cuba will reportedly be sending doctors to the Solomon Islands, Vanuatu, Tuvalu, Nauru and Papua New Guinea, while seventeen medical students from Vanuatu will study in Cuba. It may also provide training for Fiji doctors. Indeed, Fiji's ambassador to the United Nations, Berenado Vunibobo, has stated that his country may seek closer relations with Cuba, and in particular medical assistance, following a decline in Fiji's relations with New Zealand.

International organizations and groups 

ACS • ALBA • AOSIS • CELAC • CTO • ECLAC • G33 • G77 • IAEA • ICAO • ICRM • IFAD • ILO • IMO • Interpol • IOC • ISO • ITU • LAES • NAM • OAS • OEI • OPANAL • OPCW • PAHO • Rio Group • UN • UNCTAD • UNESCO • UPU • WCO • WHO • WIPO • WMO

Caribbean Community (CARICOM) 

Ties between the nations of the Caribbean Community (CARICOM) and Cuba have remained cordial over the course of the later half of the 20th century. Formal diplomatic relations between the CARICOM economic giants: Barbados, Jamaica, Guyana and Trinidad and Tobago have existed since 1972, and have over time led to an increase in cooperation between the CARICOM Heads of Government and Cuba. At a summit meeting of sixteen Caribbean countries in 1998, Fidel Castro called for regional unity, saying that only strengthened cooperation between Caribbean countries would prevent their domination by rich nations in a global economy. Cuba, for many years regionally isolated, increased grants and scholarships to the Caribbean countries.

To celebrate ties between the Caribbean Community and Cuba in 2002 the Heads of Government of Cuba and CARICOM have designated the day of December 8 to be called 'CARICOM-Cuba Day'. The day is the exact date of the formal opening of diplomatic relations between the first CARICOM-four and Cuba.

In December 2005, during the second CARICOM/CUBA summit held in Barbados, heads of CARICOM and Cuba agreed to deepen their ties in the areas of socio-economic and political cooperation in addition to medical care assistance. Since the meeting, Cuba has opened four additional embassies in the Caribbean Community including: Antigua and Barbuda, Dominica, Suriname, and Saint Vincent and the Grenadines. This development makes Cuba the only nation to have embassies in all independent countries of the Caribbean Community. CARICOM and Canadian politicians have jointly maintained that through the International inclusion of Cuba, a more positive change might indeed be brought about there (politically) as has been witnessed in the People's Republic of China.

Cuban cooperation with the Caribbean was extended by a joint health programme between Cuba and Venezuela named Operación Milagro, set up in 2004. The initiative is part of the Sandino commitment, which sees both countries coming together with the aim of offering free ophthalmology operations to an estimated 4.5 million people in Latin America and the Caribbean over a ten-year period. According to Denzil Douglas, the prime minister of St. Kitts and Nevis, more than 1,300 students from member nations are studying in Cuba while more than 1,000 Cuban doctors, nurses and other technicians are working throughout the region. In 1998 Trinidadian and Tobagonian Prime Minister Patrick Manning had a heart valve replacement surgery in Cuba and returned in 2004 to have a pacemaker implanted.

In December 2008 the CARICOM Heads of Government opened the third Cuba-CARICOM Summit in Cuba. The summit is to look at closer integration of the Caribbean Community and Cuba. During the summit the Caribbean Community (CARICOM) bestowed Fidel Castro with the highest honour of CARICOM, The Honorary Order of the Caribbean Community which is presented in exceptional circumstances to those who have offered their services in an outstanding way and have made significant contributions to the region.

In 2017 Cuba and the Caribbean Community (CARICOM) bloc signed the "CARICOM-Cuba Trade and Economic Cooperation Agreement"

Organization of American States 

Cuba was formerly excluded from participation in the Organization of American States under a decision adopted by the Eighth Meeting of Consultation in Punta del Este, Uruguay, on 21 January 1962. The resolution stated that as Cuba had officially identified itself as a Marxist–Leninist government, it was incompatible with "the principles and objectives of the inter-American system." This stance was frequently questioned by some member states. This situation came to an end on 3 June 2009, when foreign ministers assembled in San Pedro Sula, Honduras, for the OAS's 39th General Assembly, passed a vote to lift Cuba's suspension from the OAS. In its resolution (AG/RES 2438), the General Assembly decided that:

 Resolution VI, [...] which excluded the Government of Cuba from its participation in the Inter-American system, hereby ceases to have effect
 The participation of the Republic of Cuba in the OAS will be the result of a process of dialogue initiated at the request of the Government of Cuba, and in accordance with the practices, purposes, and principles of the OAS.

The reincorporation of Cuba as an active member had arisen regularly as a topic within the inter-American system (e.g., it was intimated by the outgoing ambassador of Mexico in 1998) but most observers did not see it as a serious possibility while the Socialist government remained in power. On 6 May 2005, President Fidel Castro reiterated that the island nation would not "be part of a disgraceful institution that has only humiliated the honor of Latin American nations".

In an editorial published by Granma, Fidel Castro applauded the Assembly's "rebellious" move and said that the date would "be recalled by future generations." However, a Declaration of the Revolutionary Government dated 8 June 2009 stated that while Cuba welcomed the Assembly's gesture, in light of the Organization's historical record  "Cuba will not return to the OAS".

Cuba joined the Latin American Integration Association becoming the tenth member (out of 12) on 26 August 1999. The organization was set up in 1980 to encourage trade integration association. Its main objective is the establishment of a common market, in pursuit of the economic and social development of the region.

On September 15, 2006, Cuba officially took over leadership of the Non-Aligned Movement during the 14th summit of the organization in Havana.

Cuban intervention abroad: 1959 – Early 1990s 
Cuba became a staunch ally of the USSR during the Cold War, modeling its political structure after that of the CPSU. Owing to the fundamental role Internationalism plays in Cuban socialist ideology, Cuba became a major supporter of liberation movements not only in Latin America, but across the globe.

Black Panthers 
In the 1960s and 1970s, Cuba openly supported the black nationalist and Marxist-oriented Black Panther Party of the U.S. Many members found their way into Cuba for political asylum, where Cuba welcomed them as refugees after they had been convicted in the U.S.

Palestine 

Cuba also lent support to Palestinian nationalist groups against Israel, namely the Palestine Liberation Organization (PLO) and lesser-known Marxist–Leninist Popular Front for the Liberation of Palestine (PFLP). Fidel Castro called Israel practices "Zionist Fascism." The Palestinians received training from Cuba's General Intelligence Directorate, as well as financial and diplomatic support from the Cuban government. However, in 2010, Castro indicated that he also strongly supported Israel's right to exist.

Irish Republicans 

The Irish Republican political party, Sinn Féin has political links to the Cuban government. Fidel Castro expressed support for the Irish Republican cause of a United Ireland.

Humanitarian aid 

Since the establishment of the Revolutionary Government of Cuba in 1959, the country has sent more than 52,000 medical workers abroad to work in needy countries, including countries affected by the 2004 Indian Ocean earthquake and the 2005 Kashmir earthquake. There are currently about 20,000 Cuban doctors working in 68 countries across three continents, including a 135-strong medical team in Java, Indonesia.

Read more about Cuba's medical collaboration in Africa at:

 White Coats by the Gambia River

Cuba provides Medical Aid to Children Affected by Chernobyl Nuclear Accident:

 The children of Chernobyl in My Memory

List of Foreign Ministers of Cuba

See also 

 Censorship in Cuba
 Cocktail Wars
 Human rights in Cuba
 Intelligence Directorate
 List of diplomatic missions in Cuba
 List of diplomatic missions of Cuba
 Organization of Solidarity with the People of Asia, Africa and Latin America

References

Further reading
 Adams, Gordon. "Cuba and Africa: The International Politics of the Liberation Struggle: A Documentary Essay" Latin American Perspectives (1981)  8#1 pp:108-125.
 Bain, Mervyn J. "Russia and Cuba: 'doomed' comrades?." Communist and Post-Communist Studies 44.2 (2011): 111–118.
 Bain, Mervyn J.  Soviet-Cuban Relations, 1985 to 1991: Changing Perceptions in Moscow and Havana (2007)
 Bernell, David. "The curious case of Cuba in American foreign policy." Journal of Interamerican Studies and World Affairs 36.2 (1994): 65-104. online
 Blue, Sarah. "Cuban Medical Internationalism: Domestic and International Impacts." Journal of Latin American Geography (2010)  9#1.
 Domínguez, Jorge I. To Make a World Safe for Revolution: Cuba's Foreign Policy (Harvard UP, 1989)  excerpt
 Erisman, H. Michael, and John M. Kirk, eds. Redefining Cuban Foreign Policy: The Impact of the “Special Period” (2006)
 Falk, Pamela S.  "Cuba in Africa." Foreign Affairs 65.5 (1987): 1077–1096. online
 Falk, Pamela S. Cuban Foreign Policy: Caribbean Tempest (1986).
 Fauriol, Georges,  and Eva Loser, eds.  Cuba: The International Dimension (1990)
 Feinsilver,  Julie M. “Fifty Years of Cuba’s Medical Diplomacy: From Idealism to Pragmatism,” Cuban Studies 41 (2010), 85–104; 
 Gleijeses, Piero. "Moscow's Proxy? Cuba and Africa 1975–1988." Journal of Cold War Studies 8.4 (2006): 98-146.  online
 Gleijeses, Piero. Conflicting Missions: Havana, Washington, and Africa, 1959-1976 (2002) online
 Gleijeses, Piero. The Cuban Drumbeat. Castro’s Worldview: Cuban Foreign Policy in a Hostile World (2009)
 Harmer, Tanya. "Two, Three, Many Revolutions? Cuba and the Prospects for Revolutionary Change in Latin America, 1967–1975." Journal of Latin American Studies 45.1 (2013): 61–89.
 Hatzky, Christine. Cubans in Angola: South-South Cooperation and Transfer of Knowledge, 1976–1991.  (U of Wisconsin Press, 2015).
 Krull, Catherine. ed. Cuba in a Global Context: International Relations, Internationalism, and Transnationalism (2014)  online
 Pérez-Stable, Marifeli. "The United States and Cuba since 2000." in Contemporary US-Latin American Relations (Routledge, 2010) pp. 64–83.
 Pérez-Stable, Marifeli. The United States and Cuba: Intimate Enemies (2011) recent history online
 Smith, Robert F. The United States and Cuba: Business and Diplomacy, 1917-1960 (1960) online
 Taylor, Frank F. "Revolution, race, and some aspects of foreign relations in Cuba since 1959." Cuban Studies (1988): 19–41.

External links 

 Cuban Ministry of Foreign Affairs 
 Cuban Mission to the United Nations
 Text of U.S.- Cuban agreement on military bases 
 Fidel Castro's 'Reflection' on U.S. Travel Restrictions Miami Herald, April 14, 2009
 CWIHP e-Dossier No. 44, with an introduction by Piero Gleijeses (October 2013). The dossier features over 160 Cuban documents pertaining to Havana's policy toward Southern Africa in the final fifteen years of the Cold War.

Representations of other countries in Cuba

 Chinese Embassy in Havana
 Embassy of India in Havana
 The Canadian Embassy in Cuba

Cuban representations to other countries

 Cuban embassies around the world

Aspects of Cuba's foreign policy

 "Cuba's health diplomacy", British Broadcasting Corporation, February 25, 2010.